Gyoun Maru (Japanese: 曉雲丸) was an auxiliary transport of the Imperial Japanese Navy during World War II.

History
She was launched on 8 April 1890 and completed in June 1890 at the Paisley, Renfrewshire shipyard of Fleming & Ferguson for J & A Brown of Australia and christened SS Duckenfield. She was registered in Newcastle, New South Wales, and was used as a 'sixty-miler' collier. In 1933, she was purchased by Moller & Company of Shanghai which operated numerous shipping companies (the Moller Line, Trader Line Ltd., British China Steamship Co, and Zodiac Shipping) and renamed SS Ethel Moller. In 1935, she was converted as a salvage vessel for Moller´s Towages Ltd. On 25 November 1942 she was scuttled at Hong Kong to prevent seizure by the Japanese but on 28 December 1942 she was seized and then re-floated and repaired by the Imperial Japanese Navy and renamed Gyoun Maru.

On 3 July 1944, she was part of Convoy No. 91 en route from Takao to Hong Kong consisting of three other transport/cargo ships and two escorts (the  Kuri and the  Hatsukari).  The US submarine   torpedoed and sank the transport Nitto Maru and the cargo ship Gyoyu Maru (the ex-British Joan Moller) and then soon after midnight on the 4th, the cargo ship, Kyodo Maru No. 28. Gyoun Maru and its two escorts, were able to reach Hong Kong without further incident on 5 July.

Other ships sunk in the attack were transports Bujo Maru and Joshu Maru; Imperial Japanese Army cargo ship Yamahagi Maru; merchant cargo ships Hakko Maru, Tenjin Maru No. 11 and Takatomi Maru No. 1; merchant tankers Nanshin Maru No. 5, Nanshin Maru No. 11, and Nanshin Maru No. 20; and dredger Niitaka Maru. Ships damaged were tanker Eiho Maru; army cargo ship Shinto Maru; Teisho Maru (ex-German Havenstein); and cargo ships Taisho Maru and Taihoku Maru.

References

World War II naval ships of Japan
Ships built in Scotland
1890 ships
Auxiliary ships of the Imperial Japanese Navy
Maritime incidents in October 1944